GCSE is the initialism of General Certificate of Secondary Education.

GCSE can also refer to:
 Global common subexpression elimination, an optimization technique used by some compilers.
 "Ghetto Children Sex Education", a single released by UK hip-hop artist Blak Twang.
 Grand Cross of the Saxe-Ernestine House Order, a historical German Ducal award.
 Grand Cross of the Military Order of Saint James of the Sword, a Portuguese order of chilvary.